Sunnyside is a hamlet and semi-rural locality of Murray Bridge on the east (left) bank of the Murray River. It is adjacent to the east-bank localities of Greenbanks, Willow Banks and Murrawong on the west. The residential portion of the locality, Sunnyside Shack Site is accessible from Burdett Road, via Sunnyside Road.

References 

Towns in South Australia